David Manning Briggs (February 29, 1944 – November 26, 1995) was an American record producer best known for his work with Neil Young and his band Crazy Horse.

Early life and career
David Briggs was born in Douglas, Wyoming.  Briggs left Wyoming in 1962 to hitchhike his way to Los Angeles and Canada, then finally settled in California, the place he would call home for the rest of his life.  In the mid-sixties, Briggs began producing in the music business working on Bill Cosby's label, Tetragrammaton Records. One of the first albums he produced was for comedian Murray Roman.  According to Briggs, this was the first album ever released with the word "fuck" on it. Working on Cosby's label led Briggs into doing his own production work with artists such as Alice Cooper, Summerhill, Quatrain, Spirit, Nils Lofgren and his band, Grin, and Jerry Lynn Williams.

In 1968, after picking up a hitchhiking Neil Young, Briggs went on to produce the singer-songwriter's first solo album, entitled Neil Young (1968).  This led to a lifelong friendship between the two men, with Briggs co-producing over a dozen of Young's albums including  Everybody Knows This Is Nowhere and After the Gold Rush. Young's Sleeps with Angels album (1994) is the last work that Briggs produced before his death in 1995.  Other than producing with Young, Briggs worked on albums with many successful artists, including Willie Nelson, Spirit, Tom Rush, Nils Lofgren, Steve Young, Nick Cave and the Bad Seeds and Royal Trux.

A production and distribution deal was formed in 1970 between Columbia, David Briggs and attorney Art Linson.  Already an established producer, Briggs and Linson founded Spindizzy Records.

Death and posthumous projects
David Briggs died on November 26, 1995, after a battle with lung cancer. He was 51 years old. Before his death, he was still working with Joel Bernstein on the Neil Young Archives project. This project had been underway for five years before his death and it was estimated at that time that there could be anywhere from three to twenty albums worth of unreleased material. (Neil Young Archives Volumes 1 and 2 were released in 2009 and 2021 respectively.)

After Briggs's death Neil Young and Crazy Horse went on to record material such as Broken Arrow, released in 1996 and Year of the Horse, released in 1997. They have recorded sporadically in the new millennium, releasing the studio albums Greendale (2003), Americana, Psychedelic Pill (both 2012), Barn (2021) and World Record (2022).

The band The Low & Sweet Orchestra was working with David Briggs at the time of his death.  Their album Goodbye To All That was released in 1996, and featured 9 out of 12 tracks produced by Briggs.

Critical views
According to his New York Times obituary: "He developed a reputation as a passionate and opinionated producer, placing great demands on the musicians with whom he worked to get the rawest, most direct sound he could in the least amount of time."

Briggs's work was not universally acclaimed. Neal Smith of the Alice Cooper group later said "David hated our music and us. I recall the term that he used, referring to our music, was 'psychedelic shit'." I think Easy Action sounded too dry, more like a TV or radio commercial, and he did not help with song arrangement or positive input in any way." His sessions with Nick Cave were also acrimonious, which led to Cave remixing the album Henry's Dream.

Personal life
David had one son, Lincoln, with artist Shannon Forbes in 1969. In 1988, Briggs married Bettina Linnenberg, who became the production coordinator on many of the projects that Briggs produced in the 1990s. These included recordings with Cave, Royal Trux, 13 Engines and Sidewinder. She also helped him on projects that remain unreleased, including work with John Eddie and Blind Melon. Briggs was a spiritual atheist.

Selective discography as producer or co-producer

Neil Young
1968 – Neil Young
1969 – Everybody Knows This Is Nowhere
1970 – After the Gold Rush
1974 – On the Beach
1975 – Tonight's the Night
1975 – Zuma
1977 – American Stars 'N Bars
1978 – Comes a Time
1979 – Rust Never Sleeps
1979 – Live Rust
1981 – Re-ac-tor
1982 – Trans
1985 – Old Ways
1987 – Life
1990 – Ragged Glory
1991 – Weld
1993 – Unplugged
1994 – Sleeps with Angels
2017 – Hitchhiker
2018 – Roxy: Tonight's the Night Live
2018 – Songs for Judy
2021 – Way Down in the Rust Bucket

Other Artists
1968 Murray Roman – You Can't beat People Up and Have Them Say "I Love You"
1968 Lost and Found – Lost and Found
 1968 Quatrain – Quatrain
1969 Summerhill – Summerhill
1970 Alice Cooper – Easy Action
1970 Tom Rush – Wrong End of the Rainbow
1970 Spirit – Twelve Dreams of Dr. Sardonicus
1971 Nils Lofgren & Grin – Grin
1972 Nils Lofgren & Grin – 1+1
1972 Spirit – Feedback
1973 Kathi McDonald – Insane Asylum
1975 Nils Lofgren –  Nils Lofgren
1976 Nils Lofgren – Cry Tough
1986 Bradley Ditto – Check Me Out
1992 Nick Cave and the Bad Seeds – Henry's Dream
1995 Royal Trux – Thank You
1996 The Low & Sweet Orchestra – Goodbye to all that

References

1944 births
1995 deaths
Record producers from Wyoming
People from Douglas, Wyoming
20th-century American businesspeople
American atheists